Sydney Uni Boxing Club (SUBxC), established in 1908, is the University of Sydney's boxing club. Prior to 1908, the Club existed as a division of Sydney University Athletics Club. SUBxC is a founding member of the NSW Amateur Boxing Association (NSW ABA, known also as Boxing NSW), and is currently a member club of Sydney Uni Sport and Fitness, where it conducts all levels of boxing training at the dedicated facilities of the University Sports & Aquatic Centre. Historically, the Club has competed against other Australian universities, as well as teams from the Australian military.

Competition
Sydney Uni Boxing Club enters its own competitive boxers in State/National competition, and also hosts the annual University of Sydney Inter-Collegiate and Club Boxing Tournament, which has traditionally been held on the second Wednesday of October.

Club and College Competition
Competition between the University of Sydney's Colleges occur as part of the University of Sydney Inter-Collegiate and Club Boxing Tournament, with male boxers representing St. Andrew's, St. John's, St. Paul's and Wesley competing for the trophy. Female boxers have never represented their colleges because, until 2009, it was illegal for females to compete in boxing in New South Wales. Profits from the Tournament's raffle go to aid the efforts of a local charity, the Glebe Youth Service.

Female boxers
In the University of Sydney Inter-Collegiate and Club Boxing Tournament of October 14, 2009, female boxers competed on University soil for the first time.

Coaching and Training
As an active team, Sydney Uni Boxing Club conducts club training sessions all year round, coached by the various club coaches.

References

External links
 Boxing Australia/NSW Boxing Australia/NSW Website
 Croker, G. (2003) 'Arts student eyes up Pacific IBF title', University of Sydney News, 14 November 2003.
 Cook, J. and Collings, B. (2010) 'Scientist comfortable in a lab or boxing ring', Sydney Morning Herald, 7 July 2010.
 Sydney Uni Boxing on Sydney Uni Sport and Fitness
 Sydney Uni Boxing Club - Official Facebook Group

Sport at the University of Sydney
Boxing clubs in Australia
1908 establishments in Australia
Sporting clubs in Sydney
University and college sports clubs in Australia